Cristóbal Saavedra Corvalán (born August 1, 1990, in La Ligua, Chile) is a Chilean former tennis player.

ATP Challenger & ITF Futures

Singles Titles (0)

Singles runner-up (2)

References

External links
 
 

1990 births
Living people
Chilean male tennis players
Sportspeople from Viña del Mar
21st-century Chilean people